The Other Side is a studio release by black metal band Alastis. It was released in 1997 on Century Media.

Track listing
All lyrics by War B.  All music by Alastis. 
 "In Darkness" 3:47
 "Never Again" 4:55
 "The Other Side" 4:16
 "Out of Time" 2:48
 "Through the Chaos" 3:32
 "Fight & Win" 2:30
 "Slaves of Rot" 4:38
 "Remind" 3:41
 "Under the Sign" 4:52
 "End or Beginning?" 4:02

Personnel
War B.: Vocals, Rhythm Guitar, Guitar Synthesizer
Nick: Lead Guitar
Waldemar Sorychta: Keyboards, Synthesizers
Didier Rotten: Bass, Backing Vocals
Laurent "Acronoïse" Mermod: Drums, Percussion

Production
Arranged by Alastis
Produced by Waldemar Sorychta
Recorded and mixed by Waldemar Sorychta and Siggi Bemm at Woodhouse Studios
All songs published by Magic Arts Publishing.

1997 albums
Alastis albums
Century Media Records albums
Albums produced by Waldemar Sorychta